The London and North Western Railway (LNWR) Alfred the Great class, after modification known as the Benbow Class was a class of 4-4-0 4-cylinder compound locomotives by F.W. Webb. A total of forty were built from 1901–1903.  They were a development of the Jubilee Class, with a slightly larger boiler.  

Unusually for the LNWR, the locomotives were assigned a number series, this being 1941–1980.

Compounds had proven unreliable, so starting in 1908 Whale started rebuilding the Jubilees into the 2 cylinder simple Renown Class.  Bowen-Cooke started the same process with the Benbows in 1913, and these too were added to the Renown Class.  Rebuilt engines retained their numbers.  Benbow 1974 Howe was superheated in 1921; the only member of the class so treated.

Number 1976 Lady Godiva was withdrawn in December 1922 without rebuilding.  By the grouping of 1 January 1923, when the LNWR passed into London, Midland and Scottish Railway (LMS) ownership, 25 had been rebuilt to Renowns, leaving fourteen Benbows.  Of these, 1956 was withdrawn in early 1923, before it could be allocated an LMS number, but the remaining 13—1944/52–55/64/66/67/69/70/74/77/79 were allocated the LMS numbers 5118–5130, sequentially.  The LMS continued conversions, rebuilding another eight—1952–54/64/67/69/70/74 in 1923/4.  The remainder four Benbows 1944/55/66/79 were withdrawn between 1923–1927, the last being 1974 Howe in 1928 – none of these last five received their allocated LMS numbers.  And thus the class was made extinct.

Stock list

References
 
 
 

4-4-0 locomotives
Alfred the Great
Compound locomotives
Railway locomotives introduced in 1901
Standard gauge steam locomotives of Great Britain